CAVNET was a secure military forum which became operational in April 2004. A part of SIPRNet, it allows fast access to knowledge acquired on the ground in combat.

It was used in Iraq war, and helps US military forces against the insurgents' adaptive tactics by providing data laterally and on a broader scale than with traditional reports.

The data shared between patrols on "The Net" (as is it is sometimes referred to by soldiers) has already played a crucial role to dismantle grenade-traps hidden behind posters of Moqtada al-Sadr that US soldiers often rip down.

References

Wide area networks
History of cryptography
United States government secrecy